Cutthroat Kitchen is an American cooking show hosted by Alton Brown that aired on the Food Network from August 11, 2013 to July 19, 2017. It features four chefs competing in a three-round elimination cooking competition.  The contestants face auctions in which they can purchase opportunities to sabotage one another. Each chef is given $25,000 at the start of the show; the person left standing keeps whatever money they have not spent in the auctions. The show ended on its 15th season in July 2017. The series shares some basic elements with other four-chef, three-round elimination-style competitions on Food Network including Chopped and Guy's Grocery Games. Numerous Cutthroat Kitchen contestants have competed on these shows.

Format

Each episode features four chefs competing in a three-round elimination contest. Brown gives each chef $25,000 cash before the first round; for insurance reasons, prop money is used instead of actual currency. The chefs each have their own stations to prepare and cook food, and the kitchen includes a wide range of other tools and equipment as well as a pantry stocked with ingredients.

In each round, the chefs are assigned a dish to create. Although most dishes are specific, such as macaroni and cheese, French toast, or fish and chips, Brown occasionally issues a broader challenge such as British pub food or a skillet breakfast. Other than in the first season, and a handful of later episodes, the first two rounds typically feature savory dishes and the third features a dessert. After the dish is announced, the chefs have one minute to collect all of the ingredients they need from the pantry in one trip, using metal hand-held shopping baskets. When the time runs out, Brown shuts the pantry doors and confiscates one ingredient from any chefs who are still inside before letting them leave.

In each of the first two rounds, Brown follows the shopping time by auctioning off a series of items that the chefs can use to sabotage one another. Sabotage types include equipment/ingredient changes, restrictions on movement freedom, and loss of cooking time. Sabotages are often loosely themed around the assigned dish, such as being required to follow a maze of velvet ropes in order to move between prep and cook stations while making red velvet cake. The highest bidder pays for the item out of their remaining funds, and if necessary, decides which opponent(s) will face the sabotage. The auctions are followed by the chefs preparing and plating their dishes within a set length of time, most commonly 30 minutes. Brown occasionally offers additional auctions during the cooking time. In the final round, the two remaining chefs begin cooking immediately after shopping for their ingredients, and the auctions take place while they are working. As each round progresses, Brown offers comments (delivered as a piece to camera) on the chefs' cooking methods and strategies to compensate for the sabotages.

Once the cooking time has expired, all visible indication of the sabotages is removed from the set and a judge is brought into the kitchen to evaluate the dishes. In order to ensure an unbiased opinion, the judge is sequestered in an isolation room during each round and is not told about any of the sabotages that were in effect. Each dish is judged solely on three criteria: taste, presentation, and representation of the original dish assigned. The chefs are given a chance to describe and explain their dish and choices. They may not complain in general or disclose any sabotages they faced, but they may try to explain (truthfully or otherwise) the cooking choices they made or were forced to make.

The chef whose dish is judged the least satisfactory is eliminated from the game and forfeits all of their remaining money. After the final round, the surviving chef keeps whatever money they have not spent on auction items. Two episodes have ended in a tie, with both chefs keeping their remaining money.

Judges

Jet Tila, Simon Majumdar, and Antonia Lofaso served as regular judges throughout the show. In 2016, Richard Blais became a regular judge as well, starting with the Season 12 episode "The Breakfast and the Furious." With the exception of "Judging Judges" and "Valentine's Day Massacre" (see below), each episode features only one judge who evaluates the dishes in every round. The contestants do not learn the judge's identity until they enter the kitchen at the end of the first round, and the judge is not told in advance about any of the assigned dishes.

In the Season 3 episode "Judging Judges," Lofaso, Tila, Majumdar and former guest judge Geoffrey Zakarian competed against each other with their winnings going to a charity of their choice. Lofaso won the competition with $22,000 remaining, but her charity received the full $25,000; the other three chefs each received $5,000 for their charities.

Guest judges have appeared in some episodes, as shown below.

Tournaments

Superstar Sabotage Tournament

In October 2014, a special five-part celebrity tournament subtitled "Superstar Sabotage" began airing. The contestants competed on behalf of their favorite charities for a potential top prize of $75,000. Four preliminary heats were held, with four chefs participating in each heat. The winners received their unspent money as charity donations and advanced to the finals, where they were given an initial stake of $50,000. All chefs eliminated in the preliminary heats received $2,500 for their charities.

A second Superstar Sabotage tournament premiered in November 2015.

2014 contestants

2015 contestants

Evilicious Tournament

From April 19 to May 17, 2015, Cutthroat Kitchen aired a five-part "Evilicious" Tournament featuring 16 of the show's most memorable contestants. Similar to Superstar Sabotage, this tournament consisted of four preliminary heats, with the winners keeping their unspent money and advancing to the final round for a chance to win up to $50,000 more.

Contestants

Camp Cutthroat

From August 12 to September 9, 2015, Cutthroat Kitchen aired a five-episode Camp Cutthroat tournament, which Variety described as Brown "invit[ing] the most elite Cutthroat Kitchen alumni to a secret location deep in the wilderness for an extreme culinary throw down." These episodes were filmed in Santa Clarita, California, at the same movie ranch site as the 2014 FOX reality series Utopia.

Instead of the usual 16 contestants for a tournament, only 12 participated in the 2015 tournament. This meant that each preliminary round featured only three contestants and two rounds. The finale had the usual four contestants and three rounds. Due to there being fewer contestants in the preliminaries, there was potential for more than one mid-round sabotage in the first round in each of the heats. The second and final round of each of the heats also had the contestants bid on auctions before they began cooking their dishes. This was the first such occurrence in the history of Cutthroat Kitchen.

 2015 contestants

A second Camp Cutthroat Tournament, titled Camp Cutthroat 2: Alton's Revenge began airing August 2016. The 2016 Tournament brought back 16 contestants and was filmed in Big Bear, California. No auctions were held in the last round of the finale. Instead, both chefs were subjected to conditions of simulated warfare, collecting ingredients and prepping/cooking under a bombardment of water balloons.

 2016 contestants

Time Warp Tournament

In June 2016, a special "Time Warp" Tournament aired. All 16 returning contestants were the winners of their original episodes. Each of the four heats and the finale featured dishes and sabotages from different decades, from the 1950s-80s in the four heats until the 1990s in the finale. This is the first tournament where the chefs in the finale were given the standard $25,000 to start. In all previous tournaments the chefs in the finale started with $50,000.

Contestants

Tournament of Terror

On September 28, 2016 a Halloween themed tournament, titled Tournament of Terror began airing. It brought back 16 previous contestants for a chance to win up to $50,000. The tournament concluded on October 30, 2016.

Contestants

Webisodes

Two companion series are available on the Food Network website. In Alton's After-Show, Brown meets with the judge from a particular episode and reveals the sabotages that were in effect during each round of the competition. The two discuss methods by which the chefs could have adjusted their recipes to compensate for these disadvantages. Testing the Sabotages features food stylists' efforts to create assigned dishes while complying with restrictions on ingredients and equipment.

Production

On April 23, 2013, Food Network announced Cutthroat Kitchen as part of a package of new series to be presented on Food Network.

Episodes

History
The episode "My So-Called Trifle" (season 11 episode 11; 3 March 2016) included the show's only instance of an elimination due to injury; a chef cut off the tip of her own finger in the first round and was unable to continue. The three remaining chefs advanced to the second round, and the one whose first-round dish was judged the best had their funds restored to the original $25,000. This episode set records for both the highest total spent by one chef ($35,300) and the lowest amount won ($300).

Alton Brown announced a hiatus in the fall of 2016, in order to work on new projects.  However on July 9, 2018, he announced on Twitter, while responding to a fan, that the show was cancelled.

References

External links
 Official website
 

2010s American cooking television series
2013 American television series debuts
Food Network original programming
Food reality television series
English-language television shows
2017 American television series endings
Television series by Embassy Row (production company)